Captain Martin Gerard Bayerle (born April 23, 1951) is an American treasure hunter and author, best known for finding the 1909 shipwreck of the White Star Liner RMS Republic.  He is also star of the History Channel show "Billion Dollar Wreck." The Republic was the largest ship to sink in history to her day, only to be eclipsed by the loss of RMS Titanic in 1912.  Capt. Bayerle and his company, Martha's Vineyard Scuba Headquarters, Inc. ("MAVIS") were referred to as "modern day pirates" but in a complimentary sense by Judge Nancy Gertner of the United States District Court, District of Massachusetts in a 2005 opinion granting exclusive salvage rights to the Republic to MAVIS. MAVIS subsequently acquired legal title to the RMS Republic shipwreck and her contents in August 2011, with the U.S. District Court of Boston also barring all future claims.

Biography

Early life
Martin was born in St. Albans Naval Hospital in Queens, New York, and grew up in the Brighton Beach neighborhood of Brooklyn, New York.  His father, Gerard, was a lawyer and lieutenant colonel in the U.S. Army Reserve. His mother, Ruth, was a German immigrant who came to the United States following World War II.  Martin lost sight in his left eye from a small explosives accident when he was 11 years old.  He first began scuba diving off the coast of New Jersey and New York at the age of 15 and went on to graduate from Abraham Lincoln High School in February 1969.

Early career
Martin attended Brooklyn College in New York from 1969 through 1972 where he majored in Geology.  He taught scuba diving as a student and adjunct professor within the Adult Education Department; during his time there until he opened up a dive shop - Brooklyn Divers Supply Corp. – in 1972.  He began running dive operations to local shipwreck sites, such as the Mistletoe, Black Warrior, USS Turner (DD-648), Oregon, and U-853, among others.  He trained about 1,200 people how to scuba dive and became a Master PADI SCUBA instructor in 1975 (# M1761).

Brooklyn Divers was operated successfully until 1978, when the company’s source of supply and advertisements was abruptly cut off.  Martin sued eight SCUBA company defendants for price fixing conspiracy under the Sherman Act and reached a six-figure settlement once the case went to trial in federal court in the Southern District of New York (Brooklyn Diver Supply Corp. v ScubaPro, Petersen Publications, Dacor, NASDS ... – and other major components of the sport SCUBA diving industry).  Martin then closed up his Brooklyn operations and moved to Martha’s Vineyard, Massachusetts.  There he obtained a captain’s license, pilot’s license, and established Martha’s Vineyard Scuba Headquarters, Inc. (MAVIS) to serve as a base of operations to attempt to locate the fabled shipwreck of the RMS Republic. The Republic was the largest ship to sink in history when she sank off the U.S. East Coast in January 1909 and was reportedly carrying a vast cargo of gold.

Discovery and salvage of the RMS Republic
After two and a half years of preparatory research to determine the wreck’s location, Capt. Bayerle discovered the wreck of the RMS Republic in 1981.  He raised investor capital and purchased the assets from a bankrupt Canadian offshore oil rig support company, Wolf Sub-Ocean Ltd., in addition to the purchase of a 285 ft Diving Support Vessel, the Oil Endeavor (renamed the SOSI Inspector) in the years following the find.  Martin also married during those years and he and his wife, Susan, gave birth to two children – a daughter, Tessa, and a son, Grant.  During the summer of 1987, Martin went out to perform a major salvage on the Republic to try to recover the gold, an event that generated international media attention.  Capt. Bayerle was featured on television programs such as CBS Evening News, ABC Evening News, and ABC Good Morning America.  The 74-day salvage was also closely followed in international periodicals, such as Forbes, New York Times, Associated Press, Japan Times, London Times,  and the Los Angeles Times among many other major publications.

The 1987 salvage effort was successful in targeting and excavating their target area, but failed to locate the gold, however.  The crew excavated the target area but ended up in the ship’s wine locker, finding hundreds of pre-1900 bottles of wine and champagne.  Once they realized they were in the wine locker rather than the specie room, Capt. Bayerle flew to London and appeared on ITV and BBC radio, offering a £25,000 reward for the construction plans of the Republic.  No one came forth with the plans to the ship, however, and the salvage was terminated for lack of funds.  Despite many years of research and effort, the plans to the ship still have never been found.

Post-salvage life
Following the salvage attempt, the 1987 joint venture disbanded and any artifacts brought up were sold at auction.  Martin moved to Clarksburg, West Virginia, to live with his in-laws, the Youngs, on a small farm.  He finished his undergraduate education, earning B.Sc. and B.Sc.B.Adm. magna cum laude degrees from Fairmont State College and went on to start his M.B.A. education from West Virginia University.  He was accepted into the WVU College of Law in the fall of 1990 but would not complete his legal education there, however, as other personal events intervened.

First-degree murder trial and manslaughter conviction 
On April 6, 1991, Bayerle shot and killed 38-year old Stefano Robotti, the 'lover' of his alienated wife Susan, near Clarksburg, West Virginia. He argued that he "was protecting his family," although a legal and justifiable homicide defense of self or defense of family was not offered to the jury as an option. Evidence of the sexual exploitation of Bayerle's wife and children by the deceased was presented at trial. After a six-week trial, the jury vacillated between involuntary (a misdemeanor) and voluntary manslaughter, and found him guilty of voluntary manslaughter; Bayerle was sentenced to one to five years in State prison. He completed his sentence, with good time, in two-and-a-half years.

Post conviction and release 
Upon his release, Capt. Bayerle continued school in Morgantown, West Virginia, to complete his M.B.A. education. There, he began an Internet Service Provider business that he ran for five years and established IDEA, the Internet Development and Exchange Association.

Recent developments
Capt. Bayerle subsequently started an archival research company specializing in retrieving records from government archives.  His old company, MAVIS, has since acquired legal title to the wreck of the RMS Republic and her contents, with the court also barring all future claims.  After acquiring ownership of Republic, on August 1, 2013, Bayerle published the bulk of his significant research into the mystery of RMS Republic by releasing a book titled The Tsar's Treasure: The Sunken White Star Liner With a Billion Dollar Secret.  In 2013, MAVIS retained Etoile Blanc Consulting, LLC to manage investment and media properties related to the RMS Republic recovery. Investment opportunities are made available to Accredited Investors through Lords Of Fortune LLC. ("LoF")  Captain Bayerle's personal life is also the subject of an upcoming non-fiction book series, with the first book of the trilogy planned for release in mid-2022.  Plans to adapt the series into feature films are also in development.    LoF is currently preparing for a major recovery operation of the wreck planned for the summer seasons of 2023–2024, the delay attributable to the COVID pandemic.

References

External links
 Official website of the RMS Republic shipwreck
 Official website for the book "The Tsar's Treasure: The Sunken White Star Liner With a Billion Dollar Secret"

1951 births
Living people
Treasure hunters
White Star Line
Abraham Lincoln High School (Brooklyn) alumni
Brooklyn College alumni